Left Bank generally refers to the bank of a river or other body of water that is on the left side when facing downstream. It may specifically refer to:

Places
 Left Bank of the Rhine, the western bank of the Rhine, formerly part of the Holy Roman Empire
 Left Bank (Biscay), the left bank of the Nervión in Biscay, Spain
 Left Bank (Kyiv), the left bank of the Dnieper River in Kyiv, Ukraine
 Left-bank Ukraine, a historical region in Ukraine
 Left Bank (Bordeaux), a wine region in France
 Left Bank, a laneway adjoining Cuba Street, Wellington
 Rive Gauche, the southern bank of the Seine in Paris, France

Other uses
 Left Bank (horse), an American Thoroughbred racehorse
 Left Bank (film), a 2008 Belgian film
 Rive Gauche Nightclub, a Parisian-themed nightclub in the River West District of Chicago, US
 Left Bank Cinema, an offshoot of the French New Wave
 "Left Bank", a song from the 2007 album Pocket Symphony by Air
 Left Bank Leeds, an arts centre in Leeds, England

See also
 
 
 Bank (geography)
 Right Bank (disambiguation)
 The Left Banke, a 1960s American pop group